Feed tha Streets II is the second mixtape by American rapper Roddy Ricch. It was released on November 2, 2018 by Atlantic Records and Bird Vision Entertainment. The mixtape includes the singles "Die Young" and "Every Season". This project is the sequel to his Feed tha Streets mixtape in 2017. The mixtape's sequel, Feed tha Streets III, was later released in 2022.

Singles
"Die Young" was released as the lead single from the mixtape on July 20, 2018. The song peaked at number 99 on the US Billboard Hot 100. "Every Season" was released as the second single from the mixtape on October 28, 2018. The song did not enter the Billboard Hot 100, but peaked at number 7 on the Bubbling Under Hot 100 chart.

Track listing
Credits adapted from Tidal.

Personnel
Credits adapted from Tidal.

 Dave Kutch – masterer 
 Kevin Spencer – mixer 
 William Binderup – assistant mix engineer 
 Erik Madrid – mixer

Charts

Weekly charts

Year-end charts

Certifications

Release history

References

2018 mixtape albums
Roddy Ricch albums